Cefn railway station was a minor railway station on the Great Western Railway's London to Birkenhead main line serving the mining village of Cefn Mawr in Wales. It opened as Rhosymedre in 1848 but was resited on an adjacent site in 1849 and named Cefn. It had an adjacent signal box but the station seems not to have handled freight traffic. The remains of the station and yard area can be seen just to the north of Cefn Viaduct (also known as Dee Viaduct). Although the station is gone the railway remains open as part of the Shrewsbury to Chester Line.

Historical services
Express trains did not call at Cefn and the station would only have been served by West Midlands & Shrewsbury to Wrexham & Chester local trains.

Neighbouring stations

References

Further reading

External links
 Cefn station on navigable 1946 O.S. map

Disused railway stations in Wrexham County Borough
Former Great Western Railway stations
Railway stations in Great Britain opened in 1848
Railway stations in Great Britain closed in 1960